Bin Yarouf is a patrilineal clan name used by some Arabian tribes. In the United Arab Emirates, Bin Yaroufs mainly populate the cities of Dubai, Alkhan and Dibba Al-Hisn, an enclave of Sharjah. Members of the clan live in Dibba Al-Baya, Oman, but choose not to carry the clan's name. Other members of the clan migrated to Ajman.

Etymology 

The surname is of Arabic origin (Arabic بن يعروف). It is considered one of the original clans in the United Arab Emirates. The tribe's name is Al Suwaidi.

Notable members 

 Abdulla Bin Yaroof
 Mohammed Bin Yaroof

Arab groups
Arab clans